Zara Noor Abbas, also known by her married name Zara Noor Abbas Siddiqui, is a Pakistani actress. She is best known for her role as Arsala in Momina Duraid's Khamoshi (2017), and has also acted in serials Dharkan (2016), Lamhay (2018), Qaid (2018), Deewar-e-Shab (2019), Ehd-e-Wafa (2019), Phaans (2021) and Badshah Begum (2022). She made her film debut with Wajahat Rauf's Chhalawa (2019) and later appeared in Asim Raza's Parey Hut Luv in the same year.

The daughter of actress Asma Abbas and niece of Bushra Ansari and Sumbul Shahid, Abbas made her acting debut in her early days. She used to appear in theatres and short plays. In 2016, she made her television debut with a role of Areen in Hum TV's Dharkan. She gained critical acclaim for her portrayal of Arsala in 2017 series Khamoshi which ranks among the highest rated drama series of 2017 and established her as a leading actress in Urdu television. She has played a character of Reham in 2018 crime drama series Qaid. In 2019, she has played an extended cameo appearance as Feroza Jahan in Hum TV's historical series Deewar-e-Shab and appeared as Rani in ISPR's special military series Ehd-e-Wafa. In a short review of her earlier projects and achievements, Gulf News and BBC's journalist called her a future superstar of Pakistan.

Early life
Abbas was born on 13 March 1990 in Lahore, Punjab. She is the daughter of actress Asma Abbas, niece of Bushra Ansari and maternal granddaughter of Ahmad Bashir. She is from a Punjabi background.

Career
A graduate from Beaconhouse National University, Abbas has studied film design, dancing, theatre and film making as an optional subject too. After participating in various plays and dance competitions, she made her television debut in the Fahim Burney's directed 2016 series Dharkan, where she played the lead character of Areen opposite Adeel Chaudhary and Ghana Ali. The series ran for 18 episodes and aired weekly. The series received mixed reviews from critics. Shahbano Yousuf of Daily Times stated, "We see this drama as a great blend of our culture, its norms and value mixed with fantastical romance".

In 2017 she appeared in another project with the lead role of Arsala in the critically acclaimed series Khamoshi opposite Bilal Khan, Affan Waheed and Iqra Aziz. Upon release, Khamoshi has become one of the most watched drama series of 2017 and also nominated for Best Drama Serial category at annual Hum Awards. Her on-screen chemistry with Bilal Khan was praised. According to Buraq Shabbir of The News International, the series turned out to be a game changer for her. Ahmed Sarym of The Express Tribune praised her saying, "Within a short span of time, she’s not only been able to mark a niche but also impress both commercially and critically alike".

Abbas appeared in two series in 2018. She first starred alongside Shaz Khan in Amna Nawaz Khan's directorial Lamhay which tells the story of star-crossed lovers who are reincarnated. It is her third consecutive appearance in Momina Duraid's production after Dharkan and Khamoshi. The series did not do well in terms of ratings but her performance was praised. Her next series was Qaid. She starred opposite Syed Jibran and played the role of a Reham, a Home teacher who faces difficulties when one of her students is attracted to her. The series received average reviews.

Besides television Abbas was signed to her first film, Parey Hut Luv, directed by Asim Raza, also starring Maya Ali, Mahira Khan and Shehryar Munawar Siddiqui. The film was released in August 2019. In the same year, she was signed to Wajahat Rauf's comedy-drama Chhalawa opposite Mehwish Hayat and Azfar Rehman. She was paired with her husband Asad Siddiqui in the project. Both films performed well at the box-office. She will also be part of upcoming Wajahat Rauf's venture Karachi Se Lahore 3 which will be the third installment in Karachi Lahore (film series).

Personal life
In 2017, she married fellow actor Asad Siddiqui, the nephew of Adnan Siddiqui. According to Abbas, they first met on the sets of Kis Ki Ayegi Baraat. The marriage ceremony was held in Karachi, Pakistan. They later worked together in the feature film Chhalawa and Zebaish.

Off-screen work 
Abbas frequently criticises body-shaming in the media industry. In June 2018, Abbas delivered a speech on "Power of a Single Decision" at Government College University in Lahore organized by TED Talk. She appeared for FnkAsia at Fashion Pakistan Week. In November 2019, Abbas joined hands with United Nations High Commissioner for Refugees to empower refugees in Pakistan and across the world.

Filmography

Films

Television

Other appearance

Discography

Awards and nominations

References

External links
 
 

1991 births
Living people
21st-century Pakistani actresses
Punjabi people
Pakistani Muslims
Pakistani television actresses
Beaconhouse National University alumni